Larry Krause is a former player in the National Football League for the Green Bay Packers from 1970 to 1974 as a running back. He played at the collegiate level at St. Norbert College.

Biography
Krause was born on April 22, 1948, in Stanley, Wisconsin.

See also
Green Bay Packers players

References

1948 births
Living people
Green Bay Packers players
American football running backs
People from Stanley, Wisconsin
St. Norbert Green Knights football players
Players of American football from Wisconsin